Seenu is a 1999 Indian Telugu-language romantic drama film produced by R. B. Choudary under the Super Good Films banner, directed by Sasi. It stars Venkatesh and Twinkle Khanna, and has music composed by Mani Sharma, the highlight of the film. The film is a remake of a 1998 Tamil movie Sollamale. The film was un successful at box office. It was later remade in Hindi as Pyaar Diwana Hota Hai. The performance of Venkatesh was acclaimed and made a mark on his future films. This was the first and only Telugu film of erstwhile actress, Twinkle Khanna. The film has been described has having a cult following in Andhra Pradesh.

Plot
Seenu is an honest, not-too-fashioned, village artist who comes to the city to find a job.  He ends up being a banner artist. Shwetha is a U.S. citizen, who loves India and its culture and stays with her relatives to learn about Bharatanatyam.  She is a soft-natured, loving girl who loves to help people in distress, but cannot stand it if anyone lies or cheats.  Initially, when these two meet, she mistakes Seenu to be mute and pities him. Swetha's occasional friendlier association with Seenu, in the means of helping, gradually blossoms into love. By this time, it is too late for the guilt-ridden Seenu to disclose the truth as he feared the risk of losing her. Despite all his efforts to reveal the truth, Swetha learns of his sham by herself. However, in the end, she realizes Seenu's true intentions for acting as a mute and forgives him. However, at the climax, when Swetha asks Seenu to speak to her, he keeps silent because he had asked a doctor to cut his tongue so that he could be what Swetha had come to love.

Cast

 Venkatesh as Seenu 
 Twinkle Khanna as Swetha
 Prakash Raj as Dr. Surya Prakash
 Brahmanandam as TV Anchor
 Sudhakar as Nani 
 Ali as Painter
 M. S. Narayana as Barber
 Chandra Mohan as Vikram's father 
 Charu Hasaan as Artist Farnandis 
 Brahmaji as Vikram
 Raghunatha Reddy as Swetha's father
 Anand as Riyaz 
 Raja Ravindra as Engine oil Anjineelu / Sunny
 Maharshi Raghava as MD
 Naveen as Akash
 Ananth Babu as Attender
 Chitti Babu as Parrot Horoscope Person
 Gautam Raju as Watchman
 Uttej as Painter
 Siva Parvathi as Vikram's mother
 Varsha as Lavanya
 Madhavi Sri as Swetha's mother
 Medha 
 Rajasri 
 Kalpana Rai as florist
 Vajja Venkata Giridhar as Vikram's friend
 Raasi in a special appearance (item number)

Soundtrack

Music composed by Mani Sharma. Music released on ADITYA Music Company.

References

External links
 

1999 films
Telugu remakes of Tamil films
Films scored by Mani Sharma
1990s Telugu-language films
Films directed by Sasi (director)
Super Good Films films